OKI Air International is an airline based in Podgorica, Montenegro. It is a privately owned charter airline operating within Montenegro and the surrounding area. Its main base is Podgorica Airport.

History

Fleet 
As of January 2005 the OKI Air International fleet includes:

References

External links 
Official website

Airlines of Montenegro
Airlines established in 1993
1993 establishments in Montenegro
Montenegrin brands
Companies based in Podgorica